Cox's Bazar-4 is a constituency represented in the Jatiya Sangsad (National Parliament) of Bangladesh since 2019 by Shahin Akhtar of the Awami League.

Boundaries 
The constituency encompasses Teknaf and Ukhia upazilas.

History 
The constituency was created in 1984 from the Chittagong-18 constituency when the former Chittagong District was split into two districts: Chittagong and Cox's Bazar.

Members of Parliament

Elections

Elections in the 2010s

Elections in the 2000s

Elections in the 1990s

References

External links
 

Parliamentary constituencies in Bangladesh
Cox's Bazar District